The Men's 100m T44 had its first round held on September 8 at 20:22 and the Final on September 9 at 17:52.

Medalists

Results

References
Round 1 - Heat 1
Round 1 - Heat 2
Final

Athletics at the 2008 Summer Paralympics